Avni Yıldırım (born 5 August 1991) is a Turkish professional boxer. He challenged for the IBO super-middleweight title in 2017, the WBC super-middleweight title in 2019, and the WBA (Super), WBC, and Ring magazine super-middleweight titles in February 2021.

Professional career

Yıldırım vs. Eubank Jr. 
Yıldırım compiled a perfect record of 16-0 before challenging Chris Eubank Jr. for his IBO super-middleweight title on 7 October 2017 in Stuttgart, Germany as part of the World Boxing Super Series. Eubank Jr was ranked #4 by the WBC and the IBF and #8 by the WBA. He was knocked down by Eubank Jr. in the first round, before being knocked out two rounds later.

Yıldırım vs. Mock 
Yıldırım beat Lolenga Mock by majority decision in their 12 round contest on 15 September, 2018. Mock was ranked #15 by the WBC at super middleweight at the time.

Yıldırım vs. Dirrell 
Yıldırım rebounded from his first professional career loss with a run of five consecutive victories to improve to 21-1, before challenging Anthony Dirrell for the vacant WBC super-middleweight title on 23 February 2019 in Minneapolis, Minnesota. Dirrell was ranked #1 by the WBC at the time. After Dirrell was cut from an accidental head clash, the fight was stopped in the tenth round, with Dirrell emerging as the victor by split technical decision (96-94, 96-94, 92-98). Yıldırım was not happy with the stoppage, stating “I was upset. I wanted to keep going and finish the fight as a champion.” Yıldırım's promoter, Ahmet Oener, flew to Mexico City to meet with WBC president Mauricio Sulaiman to make their case for an immediate rematch. The WBC ultimately decided to resolve the matter by ordering a title fight between Dirrell and David Benavidez with the winner being mandated to face Yıldırım. However, Yıldırım was sidetracked by injury and the COVID-19 pandemic while maintaining his mandatory position.

Yıldırım vs. Álvarez 
Following a layoff of over two years, Yıldırım returned to the ring on 27 February 2021 at Hard Rock Stadium, Miami to face highly-regarded unified super-middleweight champion Canelo Álvarez, again challenging for the WBC super-middleweight title which now belonged to Álvarez, in addition to Álvarez's WBA (Super) and The Ring titles. A huge underdog, Yıldırım was unable to overcome the odds as his opponent proved too much for him. Yıldırım retired on his stool at the end of the third round, having landed only 11 punches total in the fight, compared to Álvarez's 67.

Yıldırım vs. Cullen 
Yıldırım faced Jack Cullen as part of Fight Camp in Brentwood, England on 31 July 2021. He lost a wide unanimous decision, with scores of 100-90, 98-92, 97-93 all in favor of Cullen.

Professional boxing record

References

External links
 
 Avni Yıldırım - Profile, News Archive & Current Rankings at Box.Live

1991 births
Living people
Competitors at the 2013 Mediterranean Games
Mediterranean Games bronze medalists for Turkey
Mediterranean Games medalists in boxing
Super-middleweight boxers
Turkish male boxers